The Paper Soldier is Hugh Laurie's second novel, originally scheduled to be released in September 2009, but now indefinitely delayed. It will be the follow up to the British actor's first novel The Gun Seller, published in 1996.

The book will be released in the United States under the title The Paper Soldier, and in the United Kingdom as Paper Soldiers.

Amazon.com announced that this novel would be published in the middle of September 2007. However, as the date came and passed, Laurie's agent announced that this was a mistake on Amazon's part with his lawyer telling Mediabistro.com: "Not only is Hugh Laurie's new novel not coming out in the United Kingdom this week, Hugh hasn't even started writing it!".

Two years later, the scenario repeated itself. Due for a release in September 2009, the book never made it to the publisher. Laurie explained in a 26 August 2009 web chat hosted by The Los Angeles Times, and archived by a House fan website, "The Paper Soldier is late. Very late. Very very late." Neither Laurie, his agent, nor his publisher have stated when they expected the book to be finished.

References

Unpublished novels
21st-century British novels